Île aux Cerfs (in English: Deer Island) is a privately owned island near the east coast of Mauritius in the Flacq District.

The island of Ile aux Cerfs lies off Trou d’Eau Douce in the largest lagoon of Mauritius and offers 87 hectares of luxuriant vegetation and preserved, white, sandy beaches. Besides the Ile Aux Cerfs Golf Club, one can also experience three beach restaurants and engage in a wide variety of activities on Ile aux Cerfs.
Every day Mauritians and tourists visit the island; they depart in boats from the village of Trou d'Eau Douce and spend the whole day on the island.

Several water sports activities are available on the island.

Islands of Mauritius
Beaches of Mauritius
Private islands of Africa